The Reykjavík Summit was a summit meeting between U.S. President Ronald Reagan and General Secretary of the Communist Party of the Soviet Union Mikhail Gorbachev, held in Reykjavík, Iceland, on 11–12 October 1986. The talks collapsed at the last minute, but the progress that had been achieved eventually resulted in the 1987 Intermediate-Range Nuclear Forces Treaty between the United States and the Soviet Union.

Negotiations

Since 1986, Gorbachev had proposed banning all ballistic missiles, but Reagan wanted to continue research on the Strategic Defense Initiative (SDI), which involved the militarization of outer space. Yet Soviet suspicion of SDI continued, and U.S.-Soviet relations were strained.

At Reykjavík, Reagan sought to include discussion of human rights, emigration of Soviet Jews and dissidents, and the Soviet invasion of Afghanistan. Gorbachev sought to limit the talks solely to arms control. The Soviets acceded to the "double-zero" proposal for eliminating INF weapons from Europe, as initially proposed by President Reagan in November 1981 (INF denoting "Intermediate-Range Nuclear Forces" as distinct from ICBMs, or intercontinental ballistic missiles). The Soviets also proposed to eliminate 50% of all strategic arms, including ICBMs, and agreed not to include British or French weapons in the count.  All this was proposed in exchange for an American pledge not to implement strategic defences for the next ten years, in accordance with SALT I.

The Americans countered with a proposal to eliminate all ballistic missiles within ten years, but required the right to deploy strategic defences against remaining threats afterwards.  Gorbachev then suggested eliminating all nuclear weapons within a decade.
Gorbachev, however, citing a desire to strengthen the Anti-Ballistic Missile Treaty (ABM Treaty), added the condition that any SDI research be confined to laboratories for the ten-year period in question. Reagan argued that his proposed SDI research was allowed by any reasonable interpretation of the ABM treaty, and that he could not forget the pledge he made to Americans to investigate whether SDI was viable.  He also promised to share SDI technology, a promise which Gorbachev said he doubted would be fulfilled, as the Americans would not even share oil-drilling technology.

Some, including Reagan staffer Jack F. Matlock Jr., attribute Reagan's refusal to compromise on SDI testing to a mistaken belief that the proposed restrictions would be detrimental to the program, whereas in reality, Matlock contends, they would have had little effect on research that was still in its very early stages.

The talks finally stalled, President Reagan asking if General Secretary Gorbachev would "turn down a historic opportunity because of a single word", referring to his insistence on laboratory testing.  Gorbachev asserted that it was a matter of principle, and the summit concluded.

Result
Despite getting unexpectedly close to the potential elimination of all nuclear weapons, the meeting adjourned with no agreement; however, both sides discovered the extent of the concessions the other side was willing to make. Human rights became a subject of productive discussion for the first time. An agreement by Gorbachev to on-site inspections, a continuing American demand which had not been achieved in the Partial Test Ban Treaty of 1963 or the ABM and SALT I pacts of 1972, constituted a significant step forward.

Despite its apparent failure, participants and observers have referred to the summit as an enormous breakthrough which eventually facilitated the INF Treaty (Intermediate-Range Nuclear Forces Treaty), signed at the Washington Summit on 8 December 1987.

Key statements related to the summit

See also
 Iceland in the Cold War
 List of Soviet Union–United States summits
 Nuclear disarmament

Notes

References
 Gaddis, John Lewis. The United States and the end of the cold war : implications, reconsiderations, provocations (New York: Oxford University Press, 1992), 128–29.
 Garthoff, Raymond L. The great transition: American-Soviet relations and the end of the Cold War (Brookings Institution, 1994). pp 252–99.
 Graebner, Norman A., Richard Dean Burns, and Joseph M. Siracusa. Reagan, Bush, Gorbachev : revisiting the end of the Cold War (Westport, Connecticut: Praeger Security International, 2008), 93–95.
 Matlock Jr., Jack F. Reagan and Gorbachev: how the Cold War ended (New York: Random House, 2004).
 McCauley, Martin. Russia, America, and the cold war, 1949–1991 (New York: Longman, 1998), 69.
 Powaski, Ronald E.  The Cold War: the United States and the Soviet Union, 1917–1991 (New York: Oxford University Press, 1998), 254–55.

External links
 Future of Arms Control after the Iceland Summit from the Dean Peter Krogh Foreign Affairs Digital Archives
 A conversation with Richard Perle from the Dean Peter Krogh Foreign Affairs Digital Archives 
 These previously secret documents from the U.S and Soviet archives were added to the National Security Archive of George Washington University in October 2006.
 Reykjavík Summit: The Legacy and a Lesson for the Future.  By Dr. Nikolai Sokov at the James Martin Center for Nonproliferation Studies.  December 2007.

Cold War treaties
Foreign relations of the Soviet Union
History of the foreign relations of the United States
Soviet Union–United States diplomatic conferences
Diplomatic conferences in Iceland
1986 in Iceland
1986 conferences
1986 in international relations
1986 in politics
1980s in Reykjavík
October 1986 events in Europe
Events in Reykjavík
United States presidential visits